Café Cantante is a 1951 Argentine-Spanish historical musical film directed and written by Antonio Momplet. The film was released on July 5, 1951.

Plot

The movie takes place in mid 19th Century Andalusia, Spain. An attractive flamenco dancer and singer, Rosarillo, captivates Andalusian audiences with her talent. On her wedding night, while she performed, her husband is murdered. When she is told the news onstage, she vows to avenge her husband's murder.

Cast

Imperio Argentina as Rosario, La Petenera
Ricardo Trigo as José Luis
Francisco Martínez Allende as Juez
Andrés Mejuto as Rondeño
Edmundo Barbero as Don Paco
Ricardo Castro Ríos as Pacorro
Blanca Alonso de los Ríos as Gabriela
Albano Zuñiga as Joselillo
Emilio Escudero as Reverte

See also 
 Tablao

References

External links
 

1951 films
1950s Spanish-language films
Argentine black-and-white films
Films directed by Antonio Momplet
1950s historical musical films
Argentine historical musical films
Spanish historical musical films
Films set in Andalusia
Films set in the 19th century
1950s Argentine films